The Classic Christmas Album is a Christmas compilation album by Canadian singer-songwriter Sarah McLachlan, released on 2 October 2015 by Legacy Recordings. It includes all the songs from 2006's Wintersong plus five other Christmas tunes.

Content 
The album includes all twelve tracks from McLachlan's 2006 Christmas album, Wintersong and five other Christmas songs. "God Rest You Merry, Gentlemen / We Three Kings" was recorded backstage by Barenaked Ladies and McLachlan using one mic and done in one take at Planetfest in December 1996 for US radio station WPLT. In 2000, it appeared on the Nettwerk's compilation, Christmas Songs and in 2004, it was featured on the Barenaked Ladies album, Barenaked for the Holidays. In 2015, "God Rest You Merry, Gentlemen / We Three Kings" was included for the very first time on McLachlan's album. The Classic Christmas Album also includes "I Heard the Bells on Christmas Day" from the 2007 compilation, Stockings by the Fire. Three other songs, "Space on the Couch for Two", "Find Your Voice" and "Prayer of Saint Francis", feature The Sarah McLachlan School Choir and they were already released as free downloads in 2011, 2012 and 2013, respectively. "Prayer of Saint Francis" without The Sarah McLachlan School Choir was featured on the Surfacing album bonus disc and later on Rarities, B-Sides and Other Stuff Volume 2.

Reception
The album sold 1,000 copies in the United States in its first week.  It entered the Billboard 200 at No. 199 for chart dated December 26, 2015. It has sold 20,000 copies in the United States as of September 2016.

Track listing

Charts

Release history

See also
Wintersong
Wonderland

References

2015 Christmas albums
2015 compilation albums
Sarah McLachlan compilation albums
Albums produced by Pierre Marchand
Christmas albums by Canadian artists
Arista Records Christmas albums
Legacy Recordings compilation albums
Pop Christmas albums
McLachlan, Sarah